The Women's road race of the 2012 UCI Road World Championships cycling event took place on 22 September in  the province of Limburg, Netherlands.

Dutchwoman Marianne Vos won her second world title after finishing second 5 times since 2007. She struggled to escape for much of the 129-kilometre eight-lap race, but finally got clear on the intimidating Cauberg Hill to sprint to victory on the last two ascents. With a finishing time of three hours 14 minutes and 29 seconds, Vos beat Rachel Neylan of Australia by 10 seconds, with Italy's Elisa Longo Borghini third.

Route
The race covered 129 km and contained eight laps on a 16.5 km circuit. The finish was  beyond the summit of the Cauberg hill.

Final classification

References

External links

Women's road race
UCI Road World Championships – Women's road race
2012 in women's road cycling